Étienne-Éloi Labarre (1764–1833) was a French architect.

He produced the plans for the Colonne de la grande Armée at Wimille, erected in 1804 on the order of Napoléon I. From 1825 to 1827, he built Boulogne-sur-Mer's second-ever theatre, which was destroyed in a fire in 1854.

He was charged with completing the Palais Brongniart between 1813 and 1826, after the death of Alexandre Théodore Brongniart.

1764 births
1833 deaths
18th-century French architects
19th-century French architects
Prix de Rome for architecture
Members of the Académie des beaux-arts